Lauren-Marie Taylor (born Lauren Schwartz; November 1, 1961) is an American film and television actress, known for her role as Vickie in Friday the 13th Part 2.

Early life and education 
Taylor was born in The Bronx. She graduated from Loyola School attended Wagner College, New York University and the Circle in the Square Theatre School.

Career 
She also starred in the soap opera Loving as Stacey Donovan Forbes Alden from 1983 to 1995, the only original cast member to stay with the show for its entire run.

Taylor portrayed John Belushi's character's daughter in Neighbors (1981). Prior to Loving, Lauren starred in Ryan's Hope as Eleanor Skofield from 1980 to 1981. After Loving, she hosted her own daily crafts series, Handmade by Design, for several years on the Lifetime channel. She has also done numerous TV commercials and off-Broadway plays.

Personal life 
In 1983, she married actor and singer John Didrichsen, whom she met when they were both filming Girls Nite Out.
They have three children, Katherine, Wesley, and Olivia.

Filmography

Other work

References

External links

1961 births
American film actresses
American soap opera actresses
American television actresses
Living people
People from the Bronx
21st-century American women